Lara Shiree Davenport OAM (born 22 December 1983, in Sydney, New South Wales) in 2006, she relocated to Kingscliff, Northern NSW to train with at the High Performance Institute – New South Wales Institute of Sport by Greg Salter. During her Olympic pursuit Lara was the Ambassador for Pacific Hoists. She completed her Bachelor of Social Science (Psychology) at Bond University. 
She is currently the Chair of the Queensland Olympic Council Education Commission and a member of the Victorian Olympic Council Education Commission.

Career

Swimming

Davenport gained a scholarship at the New South Wales Institute of Sport (NSWIS) in 1999. She represented Australia at the East Asian Games: Osaka, Japan in 2001 winning three gold medals in the 100- and 200-metre butterfly, and the 4×200-metre freestyle. She competed internationally at the Mare Nostrum World Tour (Europe – 2001, 2002, 2003, 2007, 2008) and the short course World Cup Tour (2003, 2004) medalling in butterfly and freestyle events. In 2004 Lara represented Australia at the Oceania Championships: Suva, Fiji winning gold medals in the 200-metre freestyle and 4×200-metre freestyle and a silver in the 200-metre butterfly. In 2005, Lara made her first major Australian team competing at the World Championships: Montreal, Canada and won a silver medal as part of the 4×200-metre freestyle relay (heat swimmer). In 2006, Davenport made a career changing move relocated to Kingscliff and due to a back injury specialized in freestyle events. In 2006, Lara competed at the World Short Course Championships: Shanghai, China resulting in a gold and silver medal in the 4×200-metre and 4×100-metre freestyle relay (heat swimmer).  At the 2007 World Aquatics Championships in Melbourne, Lara gained selection in the 4x200 metre freestyle relay team for the final (Jodie Henry, Stephanie Rice, Lara Davenport and Libby Trickett) after posting the fastest split of the Australian swimmers in the heat. The team came 4th in the final. 

At the 2008 Australian Swimming Championships she qualified for the 2008 Summer Olympics in Beijing as a member of the 4×200-metre freestyle relay. Lara swam the final leg of the heats in Beijing safely qualifying the final team. Lara successfully posted her personal best at the Olympics demonstrating her ability to perform under pressure. As part of the 4×200-metre freestyle relay, Davenport won gold when the first-choice quartet won the final in a world record time.

Lara has stated that during her swimming career that she was coached by some of the world's best coaches and mentors that assisting her to reach the pinnacle of sport, the Olympic Games. Overcoming injury, missing team selection by 0.01 of a second and overcoming adversity outside of the pool have been credited by her as an integral part of her development within the sport. Lara was the head coach at Kingscliff Swimming Club and is actively involved in giving back to the sport through mentoring and involvement education programs about the philosophy of the Olympic Movement.

Post-swimming career

Community development

Lara developed an early passion for community development through sport, and has been extensively involved in the not for profit sector both during, and after, her graduation from university.  Davenport serves as a Role Model for Red Dust, a program manager with the Stride Foundation, and the Queensland and Victorian Olympic Councils Education Committees, as Chair and Executive Member of the respectively.

Lara also presents at motivational presentations to corporate organisations, not for profit organisations and schools regularly.

Performance enhancement

In 2015, Davenport started a consulting and coaching business, focusing on performance enhancement, health promotion, leadership and community development through evidenced based experiential techniques and programs. She is currently completing her Diploma in Mindfulness Therapy (Teachers Training Course) accredited by the International Meditation Teachers Association. and the International Institute of Complementary Therapy.

Honours and awards
2015 Member of The Order of Australia Association ( Association with the UK, VIC, NSW & QLD).
2012 Selected tribunal member for the Olympic Team Selection Appeals Tribunal for the Australian Olympic Swimming Team.
2008 Lara was awarded the "Key to the City’ Gold Coast for "recognition of outstanding sporting achievement at the Beijing Olympics".
At the 2008 Australian Day Honours, Davenport was awarded the Order of Australia Medal "for service to sport and the community"
Australian Open Championship medallist since 2003.
2WS Sportsperson of the year 2002.
Australian Open Championship Finalist since 2000.
New South Wales Institute of Sport scholarship holder since 1999.

See also
 List of Olympic medalists in swimming (women)

References

External links
Lara Davenport OAM Official Website (www.laradavenport.com)

1983 births
People from New South Wales
Swimmers at the 2008 Summer Olympics
Olympic swimmers of Australia
Olympic gold medalists for Australia
Living people
Australian female freestyle swimmers
Medalists at the 2008 Summer Olympics
Olympic gold medalists in swimming
Recipients of the Medal of the Order of Australia